Orella may refer to:

Orella, India, a village and panchayat in Ranga Reddy district
Orella, Nebraska, a community in the United States

See also
Orilla